The 1900 Summer Olympics, officially the Games of the II Olympiad, were an international multi-sport event which was held in 1900 in Paris, France. Gold medals were not given at the 1900 Games. A silver medal was given for a first place and a bronze medal was given for second.  The International Olympic Committee has retroactively assigned gold, silver, and bronze medals to competitors who earned 1st, 2nd, and 3rd-place finishes respectively in order to bring early Olympics in line with current awards.

{| id="toc" class="toc" summary="Contents"
|align="center" colspan=4|Contents
|-
|
Archery
Athletics
Basque pelota
Cricket
Croquet
Cycling
|valign=top|
Equestrian
Fencing
Football
Golf
Gymnastics
Polo
|valign=top|
Rowing
Rugby union
Sailing
Shooting
Swimming
Tennis
|valign=top|
Tug of war
Water polo
|-
|align=center colspan=4|See also   References
|}


Archery

Athletics

Basque pelota

Cricket

Croquet

Cycling

Equestrian

Fencing

Football

Golf

Gymnastics

Polo

Rowing

Rugby union

Sailing

The data below notes all races and medalists of the regattas of the Games of the second Olympiad, as well as of the Exposition Universelle and counts all winners as medalists, because the IOC website currently affirms a total of 95 medal events in the Games.

Shooting

Swimming

Tennis

Tug of war

Water polo

See also
 1900 Summer Olympics medal table

References

External links

1900 Summer Olympics
Lists of Summer Olympic medalists by year